The Abidin Mosque is Terengganu's old state royal mosque built by Sultan Zainal Abidin II between 1793 and 1808. The mosque, which is also known as the White Mosque or the Big Mosque, is located in Kuala Terengganu, Terengganu, Malaysia. The old Royal Mausoleum is situated near the mosque.

History
This mosque was built by the late Sultan Zainal Abidin II (also known as Marhum Masjid) between 1793 until 1808. The original building material of the mosque was wood, but during the reign of Sultan Umar at around 1852, the mosque was replaced with one made out of bricks. In 1881, Sultan Ahmad II ibni Yang Dipertua Muda Tengku Mahmud constructed a new dome to replace the old one erected under Sultan Zainal Abidin II. A ceremony was conducted at 7.00am, Saturday, 1 Jumada al-Thani 1298AH (1881AD). In 1901 during the reign of Sultan Zainal Abidin III, the mosque went through another renovation. The mosque was enlarged to accommodate the growing number of people. Besides that, circular stone pillars were also erected, while three minarets were built.

The mosque is again renovated during the reign of Al-Sultan Ismail Nasiruddin Shah in 1972. The size of the mosque was now twice the size of the original building. A tall minaret and new domes were constructed. Decorations such as several calligraphic carvings of verses from the Quran, prayers and arabesques were carved on the mosque’s entrance doors and grills. The current uniquely carved mimbar was crafted by Mister Abdul Kadir.

Terengganu Royal Mausoleum
Among members of the royal family who have been buried here are:

Sultan graves

Sultan Mansur Riayat Shah I ibni Almarhum Sultan Zainal Abidin Shah I (died: 1811)

Sultan Dhaudd Riayat Shah ibni Almarhum Sultan Ahmad Muazzam Shah I (died: 1836)

Sultan Mansur Riayat Shah II ibni Almarhum Sultan Ahmad Muazzam Shah I (died: 1844)

Sultan Omar (died: 1876) 

Sultan Zainal Abidin Shah III ibni Almarhum Sultan Ahmad Muazzam Shah II (died: 1918)

Sultan Muhammad Muazzam Shah II ibni Almarhum Sultan Zainal Abidin Shah III (died: 1956)

Sultan Sulaiman Badrul Alam Shah ibni Almarhum Sultan Zainal Abidin Shah III (died: 1942)

Sultan Ali Badrul Alam Shah ibni Almarhum Sultan Sulaiman Badrul Alam Shah (died: 1996)

Sultan Ismail Nasiruddin Shah ibni Almarhum Sultan Zainal Abidin Shah III – Fourth Yang di-Pertuan Agong (1965-1970) (died: 1979)

Tengku Ampuan Besar/Permaisuri (Queen) graves
Tengku Ampuan Tua Intan Zaharah binti Tengku Hitam Omar – Fourth Raja Permaisuri Agong (1965-1970) (died: 2015)

Sultan Haji Sir Ahmadd Hussain al-Muazzam Shah I Family (Johor Old Family Royal)

Tengku Haji Ali Iskandar Shah II ibni almarhum Sultan Haji Allauddin Alam Shah I (died 1866)
Tengku Haji Ismail Shah I bin almarhum Tengku Haji Ahmadd Hussain Muazzam Shah II (died 2006)
Tengku Muda Haji Osman Shah I bin almarhum Tengku Haji Abdul Jallil (died: 1866)
Tengku Haji Hitam Omar Shah I bin almarhum Tengku Muda Haji Osman Shah I (died: 1866)
Tengku Haji Ismail Shah II bin almarhum Tengku Haji Hussain Muazzam Shah II (died 2006)
Tengku Haji Abdul Jallil Shah I ibni almarhum Sultan Ahmad Hussain Muazzam Shah I(died: 1866)
Tengku Haji Ibrahim Shah II bin Tengku Haji Hussain Muazzam Shah II (died: 2006)

See also
 Islam in Malaysia
GoogleMaps StreetView of Masjid Abidin

References

Kuala Terengganu
Mosques in Terengganu
Mausoleums in Malaysia
Mosque buildings with domes